The discography of Michael Kiwanuka, an English singer-songwriter and record producer. His debut studio album, Home Again, was released in March 2012. The album peaked at number four on the UK Albums Chart. The album includes the singles "Home Again", "I'm Getting Ready", "I'll Get Along", "Bones" and "Tell Me a Tale". His second studio album, Love & Hate, was released in July 2016. The album peaked at number one on the UK Albums Chart. The album includes the singles "Black Man in a White World", "Love & Hate", "One More Night" and "Cold Little Heart". His third studio album, Kiwanuka, was released in November 2019. The album peaked at number two on the UK Albums Chart. The album includes the singles "You Ain't the Problem" and "Hero".

Studio albums

Extended plays

Singles

Other charted songs

Guest appearances

Notes

References

Discographies of British artists